The 2007 La Tropicale Amissa Bongo Ondimbo was held from 7  to 21 January 2007 in Gabon. It was a multiple stage road cycling race that took part over a prologue and five stages.

Men's stage summary

Men's top 10 overall

References
 Official website
 De Wielersite

        

La Tropicale Amissa Bongo Ondimbo
La Tropicale Amissa Bongo Ondimbo
2007 in African sport
La Tropicale Amissa Bongo